The 1992 NAIA Division I football season was the 37th season of college football sponsored by the NAIA, was the 23rd season of play of the NAIA's top division for football.

The season was played from August to November 1992 and culminated in the 1992 NAIA Champion Bowl playoffs and the 1992 NAIA Champion Bowl, played this year on December 12, 1992 at Ernest W. Spangler Stadium in Boiling Springs, North Carolina, on the campus of Gardner–Webb College.

Central State (OH) defeated Gardner–Webb in the Champion Bowl, 19–16, to win their second NAIA national title. It was the Marauders' third consecutive appearance in the Champion Bowl, going 1–1 in the previous two.

Conference standings

Conference champions

Postseason

See also
 1992 NCAA Division I-A football season
 1992 NCAA Division I-AA football season
 1992 NCAA Division II football season
 1992 NCAA Division III football season

References

 
NAIA Football National Championship